Phantom Queen (다정불심 - Dajeong bulshim) aka Tender Heart is a 1967 South Korean film directed by Shin Sang-ok.

Synopsis
Towards then end of the Goryeo Dynasty, King Gongmin, grieving for the death of Queen Noguk, gives power to a corrupt and lecherous monk.

Cast
Choi Eun-hee
Kim Jin-kyu
Park Nou-sik
Choe Seong-ho 
Han Eun-jin 
Choi Sam 
Seong So-min 
Go Seon-ae 
Lee Gi-hong 
Seo Wol-yeong

Bibliography

References

Films directed by Shin Sang-ok
1960s Korean-language films
South Korean drama films